Mumbai North Central Lok Sabha constituency is a Lok Sabha (parliamentary) constituency of Maharashtra state in western India.

Assembly segments
Presently, after the implementation of the delimitation of the parliamentary constituencies in 2008, Mumbai North Central Lok Sabha constituency comprises the following six Vidhan Sabha segments:

Members of Parliament

Note:
^ by-poll

Election results

General elections, 2019

General elections, 2014

General elections, 2009

General elections, 2004

General elections, 1999

General elections, 1998

General elections, 1996

General elections, 1991

General elections, 1989

General elections, 1984

General elections, 1980

General elections, 1977

General elections, 1952

Two candidates were elected from some seats in 1952 elections. 
One MP was  :  Vitthal Gandhi, Congress (149,138 votes) defeated the socialist leader Ashok Mehta (139,741) 
Second MP   :  Narayan Kajrolkar, Congress (138,137 votes) defeated Dr Ambedkar (123,576)

See also
 Mumbai
 List of Constituencies of the Lok Sabha

Notes

External links
Mumbai North-Central lok sabha constituency election 2019 results details

Lok Sabha constituencies in Maharashtra
Politics of Mumbai
Lok Sabha constituencies in Mumbai